The Qatar Basketball Federation is the governing body of basketball in Qatar.

The federation was founded in 1964 and joined FIBA in 1977 and FIBA Asia in 1979. It represents basketball with public authorities as well as with national and international sports organizations and as such with Qatar in international competitions. It also defends the moral and material interests of Basketball in Qatar. It is affiliated with FIBA and FIBA Asia.

The federation also organizes the Qatar national basketball team and the Qatar women's national basketball team.

Leagues
Qatari Basketball League

References 

Official website of Qatar Basketball Federation
FIBA Profile

1964 establishments in Qatar
Basketball in Qatar
Basketball governing bodies in Asia
Sports organizations established in 1964